Live From Memphis is a volunteer organization supporting music, film, and art from Memphis, Tennessee.  It was initially established in 2000 with a focus on capturing local music and showcasing it to the world.  Reflective of such publications as The Rise of the Creative Class and The Memphis Manifesto (which focus on cultivating creativity as a critical resource to individual, community, and economic life) Live From Memphis seeks to serve and better its community through creating artist-based projects and providing resources and tools for its members.

Offerings 
Live From Memphis runs various projects throughout the year:
The Li'l Film Fest: A quarterly, theme-based film festival, focusing on highlighting our local talent while showcasing interesting happenings around town.
The Music Video Showcase: An annual showcase of local music videos.  The showcase is held every October in conjunction with the larger Indie Memphis Film Festival run by Delta Axis.
The Creative Directory: Memphis' only comprehensive artist and industry directory for Memphis Music, Film and the Arts. 
Live From Memphis also host various music, short films, videos, and works of art, all of which are locally produced.

References 
Memphis Flyer May 2002
Commercial Appeal August 7, 2007
Commercial Appeal January 2, 2004
Memphis New Bureau October 27, 2004
Memphis Business Journal March 27, 2006
Commercial Appeal (Beifuss Blog) September 26, 2006
Smart City Memphis October 7, 2005

External links 
LiveFromMemphis.com
The Li'l Film Fest
The Music Video Showcase
Memphis Flyer - Live...From Memphis, An extrodianary new website...
Commercial Appeal - Music Television, Indie Memphis-style...
Smart City Memphis - Looking To The Future...
Commercial Appeal - Website looks to build connections in local music scene
Memphis News Bureau - Memphis music website creates some noise in the birthplace of rock-n-roll
The Memphis Talent Magnet Project: Attracting the Best and Brightest... (this page is slow to load)

Organizations based in Memphis, Tennessee
Music organizations based in the United States
American entertainment websites